Kermani (also Romanized as Kermānī) is a village in Derakhtengan Rural District, in the Central District of Kerman County, Kerman Province, Iran. At the 2006 census, its population was 28, in 10 families.

References 

Populated places in Kerman County